Colonel Sir Francis Worgan Festing   (24 July 1833 – 21 November 1886) was a British Royal Marines officer.

Festing, second son of Captain Benjamin Morton Festing R.N. K.H. by Caroline Jane, only daughter of F. B. Wright of Hinton Blewett, Somersetshire, was born at High Littleton, Somerset, 24 July 1833. He was educated at the Royal Naval College, New Cross, at the age of sixteen entered the Royal Marines as a cadet, and was gazetted second lieutenant 3 July 1850.

In 1854 he served with the Baltic expedition. He commanded a mortar in the flotilla employed against Sebastopol from June 1855 until the fall of that fortress and was also at the bombardment and surrender of Kinburn. For these services he received a medal with clasp, was made a Chevalier of the Legion of Honour, and had the Turkish medal bestowed on him.

His next war services were with the China expedition 1857–9 as adjutant of the artillery, when he assisted in the blockade of the Canton River and in the bombardment and storming of the city, and was rewarded with a medal and clasp and his brevet of major.

He served throughout the Ashantee war during 1873–4, and when the Ashantee army under Amanquatia threatened Cape Coast Castle, he was selected to command the detachment of marines sent to the Gold Coast in May 1873 to assist in repelling the Ashantee army, which was then encamped at Mampom, between Abrakampa and the river Prah, and within nine miles of Cape Coast Castle. The chiefs of Ehina were asked to lay down their arms, and on their refusal their town was attacked on 13 June. Festing commanded the forces in the two engagements fought on that day, when the natives were defeated and their town burnt. On the arrival of Sir Garnet Wolseley, Festing was placed in command at Cape Coast, and charged with the measures for the defence of the place. He was taken on Wolseley's list of special service officers on 20 October, and took the command of the native camp at Dunquah and of the advanced posts. He commanded the forces at the engagements near Dunquah on 27 October, when he was slightly wounded, and on 3 November, when he was severely wounded while trying to rescue Lieutenant Eardley Wilmot of the Royal Artillery, who had fallen mortally wounded (The Graphic, 2 May 1874, p. 420, with woodcut). He was afterwards placed in charge of the camp at Prahsu. He held a dormant commission to administer the government of the Gold Coast while commanding the regular troops, and was of the executive council. He was specially allowed to retain the rank of colonel (brevet-colonel, 7 January 1874) in the army for his distinguished services in the field at the conclusion of the war, and was nominated CB 31 March 1874, and KCMG 8 May 1874, and received the thanks of both Houses of Parliament 30 March 1874 (Hansard, 1874, ccxviii. 383, 412).

Festing was appointed assistant adjutant-general of the Royal Marines in August 1876, made an aide-de-camp to the Queen 7 July 1879, and gazetted colonel commandant of the Royal Marine Artillery 3 September 1886.

In January 1865 the schooner Ocean was wrecked on the Woolsiner Sand Bank off Hayling Island. Festing using the RMA cutter used for towing targets for Fort Cumberland manned by 12 Hayling fishermen rescued three from the crew of five. This rescue resulted in national publicity and the establishment of a lifeboat on Hayling Island. Festing was awarded the RNLI's silver medal for Gallantry.

He died at Donnington Lodge, Newbury, 21 November 1886, and was buried with military honours at Eastney cemetery, Portsmouth, 26 November. He had been married three times, first, in 1862, to Margaret Elizabeth, daughter of A. Hall of Watergate, Sussex; she died at Hayling Island 3 June 1864; secondly, in 1869, to Charlotte Letitia, daughter of R. J. Todd; she died in 1871; thirdly, on 14 September 1876, to Selina Eleanor Mary, only daughter of Leycester William Carbonell.

References

1833 births
1886 deaths
People from Bath and North East Somerset
Companions of the Order of the Bath
Knights Commander of the Order of St Michael and St George
Royal Marines officers
Royal Navy personnel of the Crimean War
Royal Navy personnel of the Second Opium War
British military personnel of the Third Anglo-Ashanti War
Chevaliers of the Légion d'honneur
Francis Worgan